Symphyotrichum ciliolatum (formerly Aster ciliolatus), commonly known as Lindley's aster and fringed blue aster, is a perennial herb native to Canada and the northern United States. It is also known as ciliolate wood aster and northern heart-leaved aster. The common name Lindley's aster honours John Lindley who first described the species in 1834.

Description
The leaves are typically heart-shaped with winged petioles. Flowering occurs between late July and October. The ray florets are blue or bluish purple, and the disc florets are yellow, becoming reddish purple with maturity.

Taxonomy
Hybrids with Symphyotrichum laeve, Symphyotrichum novi-belgii (named Symphyotrichum x subgeminatum), and possibly Symphyotrichum lanceolatum have been recorded.

Distribution and habitat
Symphyotrichum ciliolatum grows in open forests, forest edges, thickets and along streams, trails, and roadsides. It occurs across Canada from Yukon to Newfoundland, and in the northern United States from Montana to New York.

Citations

References

ciliolatum
Flora of Canada
Flora of the Northeastern United States
Flora of the North-Central United States
Flora of the Northwestern United States
Plants described in 1834
Taxa named by John Lindley